Tetulia or Tentulia also known as "The City of Dream" or "স্বপ্নের শহর" is an upazila of Panchagarh District in the Division of Rangpur, Bangladesh.

Demographics
Tetulia has a population of 124,041. Males constitute 51.52% of the population, and females 48.48%. This Upazila's eighteen up population is 71,244. Tetulia has an average literacy rate of 25.5% (7+ years), and the national average of 32.4% literate.

Economy
The cultivation of tea, orange and pineapple is abundant in Tetulia. It is located on the Indian border with Darjeeling. A group name Kazi & Kazi has already introduced tea planting. Tea gardens have been established on plain land. Stone business is also flourishing here.

Points of interest
Kazi & Kazi Tea Estate, Rowshanpur
Banglabandha Land port
Sharial Tea Garden
Asian Highway
Tetultola, Tetulia Chourasta
Tetulia Gate

Administration
Tetulia Upazila is divided into seven union parishads: Banglabandha, Bhajanpur, Buraburi, Devnagar, Shalbahan, Tetulia, and Tirnaihat. The union parishads are subdivided into 36 mauzas and 246 villages.

The post code of Tetulia is 5030.

Transport
Tetulia is connected by road. Nearby airport is "Saidpur Airport", which is 130 km from the town. Only Hanif Enterprise & keya Paribahan operate the bus service from Dhaka.

Gallery

See also
 Upazilas of Bangladesh
 Districts of Bangladesh
 Divisions of Bangladesh

References

Upazilas of Panchagarh District